The Battle of Banja Luka took place in Banja Luka, Ottoman Bosnia, on 4 August 1737, during the Austro-Russian-Turkish War. An Austrian army under Prince Joseph Hildberghausen was defeated, as it attempted to besiege the town, when it ran into a large Ottoman relief force led by Bosnian Vizier Hekimoğlu Ali Pasha. 

The Bosnian population was aware that Austrian forces would invade Bosnia during the war; to be exact, the energetic Bosnian vizier Hekimoğlu Ali Pasha predicted in 1737 that, without a declaration of war, a large Austrian army of over 14,000 soldiers would attack Bosnia. That's why he called a meeting in Travnik with the Bosnian captains and ayans to plan the defense. At this council, all captains and ayans, above all, ultimately demanded that all preparations for defense be carried out immediately, without the knowledge and consent of Porte; thus, the Ottoman forces were planning the defense without the help of Istanbul. Vizier declared a defense in the territory of Bosnia, and quickly gathered about 10,000 soldiers in the grassland. All captains in the then Bosnian army responded to the call. After the battle took place, the Bosniak army had won an absolute victory. Five assaults broke the Austrian force and forced it to flight, leaving 1,300 dead with the great heroism of Bosnian captains and combatants. The Battle of Banja Luka is considered to be one of the most important events in the history of Bosniaks.

Cause 

While the Ottoman Empire was exhausted economically by the numerous wars (Kandy, Vienna War), the so-called "European balance" of the military forces has been established. Austria-Hungary and Russia took the lead in this. At the end of the Vienna War, Slavonia, Lika, Krbava and Dalmatia belonged to Austro-Hungary; the Bosnian eyalet practically lost all territory west of the Danube – with the exception of Banat. Consequently, the Bosnian eyalet became the westernmost and most prominent possession in the Ottoman Empire. Bosniak soldiers fought mostly on other fronts; about 10,000 were sent to fight Russia, and only a small number returned. The Bosniak population did not trust that the Ottoman Empire would send reinforcements in the event of an attack. Disappointed with various experiences, Bosniaks form their own national identity. There was a belief that their fate could easily be the fate of Muslims of Hungary, Lika, Slavonia or Dalmatia, or that they would have to emigrate.

Austria-Hungary envisioned 3 military operations in the Balkans:

 Occupation of Sanjak of Smederevo;
 Occupation Erdelj, Wallachia and Moldova;
 Complete conquest of Bosnia Eyalet.

Declaration of War 

Austria officially declared war on 14 July 1737. There were already 17,000 Austrian soldiers in Pakrac, and that number had grown rapidly. Commander was Joseph Hildburghausen, who on 15 July invited Catholic and Orthodox subjects in the Bosnian Eyalet to join his army. He also sent a message to congregants of the Islamic faith that in the event of a change of religion, he would retain his property:

"zakon vire svoie mesta imati nemože i ova iest temelita i milostiva volia i pamet naša [the law of faith of one cannot have place and this is thorough and gracious will and wit of ours]"

Austrian troops offensive 

On 10 July, Austrian troops embarked on a march; after two days they reached Gradiška. Heavy rains fell, causing the Austrians difficulties in crossing the Sava. Five days later, the crossing succeeded, and with no significant resistance they headed towards Banja Luka. The Austrian army reached Kijevci, where Hildburghausen sent General von Muffling with 7 infantry battalions, of which 3 battalions consisted of Croatian allies, 400 horsemen and 4 cannons – to take a detour to protect the Austrian army from a surprise attack.

The first skirmish 
On 20 July, the Austrian army advanced towards Jurkovići. This is where the first significant battle with the Bosniak army, commanded by Sali Aga, took place. Sali Aga had three groups of 1,000, 2,000 and 5,000 soldiers at his disposal, which surprised the Austrians. Sali Aga fought Muffling man to man and they wounded each other. Sali Aga died immediately, while Muffling succumbed two days later. The battle was an Austrian victory.

The siege of Banja Luka 
Two formations of the Austrian army – one under the command of Field Marshal Goldy and the other under Hildburghausen – joined in front of Banja Luka on 27 July. One kilometer from the Banja Luka fortress, the Austrian army raised a camp. Hildburghausen demanded that the city be surrendered unconditionally, which the defenders refused. The siege of the city began, and after three days the Austrians regrouped forces and on 27 July began firing with artillery at the fort. Between 27 July and 4 August, approximately 1,800 shells were fired daily.

The defense of Banja Luka was commanded by Mehmed Bey Ćatić; in the early days, the defenders gave strong resistance to the Austrian army. The cannon gunners of the Austrian army did not aim precisely but when the cannons were moved forward, the city center was targeted, forcing the civilian population to retreat deep into the underground walls.

Hildburghausen sends a letter to Captain Ćatić demanding that he surrenders:

Ćatić's officers declared they would not surrender and Hildburghausen received an answer:

Hekimoğlu Ali Pasha arrives to help 
After the Austrians received news that Hekimoğlu Ali Pasha had set off with 15,000 troops to help the Banja Luka people, the city was even more heavily targeted. Ćatić sent a letter to the Travnik vizier, which was carried through enemy lines by disguised Bosniak soldiers. However, the letter did not reach the vizier because they had already met the army of Hekimoğlu Ali Pasha and it had been handed over to him.

On 3 August, Hildburghausen's scouts informed him that unknown soldiers were spotted in the surrounding woods, but he made the fatal decision not to follow it further. This enabled the Bosniak army to approach the Austrian camp unnoticed.

Hildburghausen expected (though he misjudged the timing) that help would be given to the Bosniak army, and he regrouped the soldiers. Generals Succoi and Rommer guarded the right flank while Major General Baranyay shifted the artillery to the left bank of Vrbas. A considerable number of soldiers were left in reserve.

While the Austrians regrouped, the defense troops did the same.

The right wing of the army, which came to the aid of the defenders, was commanded by  Captain Mehmed Bey Fidahić; 4th sanjak of the Bosnian eyalet is placed on the left wing. Among the soldiers were ulema, muderis, etc. There were also Orthodox people faithful to the Bosnian Eyalet and Franciscans who provided material assistance to the army.

Prior to the arrival of the relieve force, the ratio of attackers to defenders was about 3 to 1; the Austrian army had about 17,000 and the Bosniak had 5,000 men.

The main battle 
As soon as troops under the command of Hekimoğlu Ali Pasha attacked the Austrian army on the morning of 4 August, the defenders began to attack on the left bank of the Vrbas. Austrian troops, under the command of Baranyay, repelled the onslaught of the defenders. During the battle, the Austrian officers deviated from the plan set by Hildburghausen, thereby unknowingly assisting the defenders; a big mistake was made by Baranyay for not deploying his infantry. One part of the Austrian army was not following the original orders, so a disturbance was caused in their ranks, and it was not possible for the army to establish a single infantry line. Bosniak cavalry used this and attacked the Austrian army center, causing them great losses.

When the defenders managed to occupy the pontoon bridge, the Austrian troops on the left bank of the Vrbas began to retreat. Mehmed Pasha, who noticed this, attacked fiercely the Austrian troops who were still resisting.

Hildburghausen ordered his troops to reinforce the left bank of the Vrbas, thereby aiding Baranyay. This move by Hildburghausen was later regarded as a major mistake of his, as it turned out that Baranyay was strategically incapable and unable to use these reinforcements.

The Austrian army on the left bank of the Vrbas was trying to escape by crossing the river, but many were non-swimmers and drowned in the river. Five soldiers each held the horses' tail to cross the river. he right wing offered even considerable resistance; the defenders carried out five attacks during the day. On the evening of 4 August, Hildburghausen ordered a withdrawal.

Chase after the Austrian army 
Mehmed Ali-Pasha orders on 5 August to pursue the fleeing Austrians. As the Bosniak troops went partly unorganized in the pursuit, 500 soldiers were lost near Klašnica when they reached the Austrian troops. On 13 August, Hildburghausen arrived in Slavonska Gradiška, where he awaited the rest of the army until 20 August.

Consequences 
About 600 defenders were killed, while the Austrian army lost about 300 troops in the direct combat. An unknown number of Austrian soldiers, according to estimates - 1,000 from Hildburghausen's camp alone, drowned in the Vrbas. At least 1,200 soldiers were wounded.

The Bosniak army seized 12 cannons, 315 tents, thousands of barrels, and many rifles, sabers and other military equipment.

The Croatian Ban Josip Esterházy, who left Bužim after the defeat of the Austrian army, explained the defeat by the lack of heavy artillery. Austrian officers cited lack of discipline among soldiers as the main reason.

Notes

References

Further reading

Basmajee, Ibrahim. Account of the War in Bosnia. contributors: Gareth Simon, Pallas Armata. [1830 translation: History of the War in Bosnia 1737-8 and 9].
Cassels, Lavender. The Struggle for the Ottoman Empire 1717–1740.
Coxe, William. History of the House of Austria.
Goodwin, Godfrey. The Janissaries.
Hickok, Michael. Ottoman Military Administration in Eighteenth-Century Bosnia.
Hochedlinger, Michael. Austria's Wars of Emergence 1683–1797
Mustafa Imamović, Osnove upravno-političkog razvitka i državnopravnog položaja Bosne i Hercegovine.
Nicolle, David. Armies of the Ottoman Turks 1300–1774.
Nicolle, David. The Janissaries.
Roider, Karl. The Reluctant Ally.
Roider, Karl. Austria's Eastern Question 1700–1790.
Rothenberg, Gunther. Military Border in Croatia, 1740–1881.
Seckendorf. Versuch einer Lebeensbeschreibung des Feldmarschall Grafen von Seckendorf.
Shaw, Stanford. History of the Ottoman Empire and Modern Turkey.
Uzunçarsılı, İsmail Hakkı (1956, 6th ed. 2007). Osmanlı Tarihi IV. Cilt 1. Bölüm: Karlofça Antlaşmasından XVİİİ. Yüzyılın Sonlarına Kadar. Ankara: Atatürk Kültür, Dil ve Tarih Yüksek Kurumu, Türk Tarih Kurumu Yayınları (Xİİİ. Dizi). .
"Defense experiences of Bosnia and Herzegovina". Sarajevo: 2013, Genocide Institute of University of Sarajevo. pp. 224–231 (institut-genocid.unsa.ba) 
"The Ottoman Conquest of Serbia in 1690. (in Serbian, with English summary)". Belgrade: 2012, Serbian Genealogy Center (academia.edu)

External links
Austro-Turkish War 1737–9, 21 September 2009 (balkanhistory.com [prev. vers.: Miniature Wargames 172, September 1997])
"Banja Luka battle of 1737, the greatest victory in the Bosnia and Bosniaks history", 17 July 2016 (bosnae.info) 

Banja Luka
Banja Luka
Banja Luka
1737 in Europe
1737 in the Holy Roman Empire
Ottoman period in the history of Bosnia and Herzegovina
Russo-Turkish War (1735–1739)
Wars involving Bosnia and Herzegovina during Ottoman period
Battles involving Ottoman Bosnia and Herzegovina
Battles involving Bosnian militia (Ottoman)